El Reyad is a city in the Kafr El Sheikh Governorate, Egypt.

Populated places in Kafr El Sheikh Governorate